Oxycera trilineata, the three-lined soldier, is a Palearctic species of soldier fly.
 Boldly marked in yellowish-green and black, it is found in a variety of wetlands, including pools, ditches, fens and swampy river margins.
 It is found in North European Russia up to Leningrad; Central
Asia, Siberia. Western Europe, north up to southern Sweden.

References

External links
Images representing Oxycera trilineata at Bold

Stratiomyidae
Diptera of Europe
Insects described in 1767
Taxa named by Carl Linnaeus